The Fork Stream is a river in the Canterbury region of New Zealand. It arises in the Gamack Range and flows south-east into the Tekapo River, which exits at Lake Benmore and eventually via the Waitaki River into the Pacific Ocean. Fraser Stream is a tributary. A high proportion of the stream's flow comes from snow melt.

There are trout in the stream.

References

Rivers of Canterbury, New Zealand
Rivers of New Zealand